Eugenius I (sometimes Eugene; died 647) was Archbishop of Toledo from 636 to 646. He became successor in 636 of Justus in that metropolitan see. Like his predecessor he had been a disciple of Helladius in the monastery of Agali. He is famous as an astronomer and astronomical mathematician.

As a bishop he was virtuous and intelligent. At this period, under the Visigothic Kingdom, the councils of Toledo were national diets convoked by the monarch, attended by lay lords; they regulated, to some extent, not only spiritual but temporal affairs.

Of these councils Eugenius presided at the Fifth Council of Toledo, convoked in 636 by King Chintila to confirm his elevation to the throne; he assisted at the sixth, convoked by the same king to take precautions against the disorders of royal elections.

This council, contrary to the principles later put in practice by Ildephonsus, banished all Jews who did not embrace Catholicism.

Eugenius attended the Seventh Council of Toledo, which was summoned by King Chindaswinth and decreed that the bishops of Toledo should reside one month every year in that city.

Sources

Archbishops of Toledo
7th-century bishops in the Visigothic Kingdom
Medieval Spanish astronomers
Year of birth unknown
647 deaths
7th-century astronomers
7th-century mathematicians

es:Eugenio de Toledo
fr:Eugenius
pl:Eugeniusz II (biskup Toledo)